Pukeashun Mountain is a peak in the Monashee Mountains in British Columbia, Canada.  It is the highest point in the Adams Plateau, part of the Shuswap Highlands.   The peak is the main feature of Pukeashun Provincial Park.  Its name means "white rock" in the local Secwepemc language.

See also
 List of Ultras of North America

References

External links
 "Pukeashun Mountain, British Columbia" on Peakbagger

Two-thousanders of British Columbia
Shuswap Country
Monashee Mountains
Kamloops Division Yale Land District